The Safir (meaning "ambassador") was the first Iranian expendable launch vehicle able to place a satellite in orbit. The first successful orbital launch using the Safir launch system took place on 2 February 2009 when a Safir carrier rocket placed the Omid satellite into an orbit with a  apogee. Making Iran the ninth nation capable of producing and launching a satellite.

The Simorgh is a larger orbital launcher based on Safir technology which has since replaced the Safir, and is sometimes called the Safir-2.

Design and specifications 
The Safir measures 1.25 meters in diameter, 22 meters in height and has a launching mass of 26 tons. The rocket consists of two stages; The first stage utilizes an upgraded Nodong/Shahab-3  type engine which burns a hypergolic combination of UDMH as fuel and nitrogen tetroxide as oxidant, producing 37 tons (363 kN; 82,500 lbf) of thrust. The second stage utilizes a pair of smaller engines (originally the Vernier engines of the R-27 Zyb Soviet SLBM) burning the same fuel combination as the first stage and producing 3.5 tons (35 kN; 7700 lbf) of thrust. This configuration gives Safir the ability to inject a payload with a maximum weight of 50 kilograms into low-earth orbit.

Variants

Kavoshgar-1
Kavoshgar-1 ("Explorer-1") was Safir's precursor used as a sounding rocket, a sub-orbital flight was conducted on 4 February 2008, as announced by state-run television. A launch on 25 February 2007 may also have been of the same type. The flight carried instruments to measure the higher atmosphere. The rocket launched on 4 February 2008 was a liquid-propellant-driven rocket, a derivative of the Shahab-3, that reached an altitude of 200–250 km in space, and successfully returned science data according to the Iranian News Agency.

On 19 February 2008, Iran offered new information about the rocket and announced that Kavoshgar-1 used a two staged rocket. The first stage separated after 100 seconds and returned to earth with the help of a parachute. The second stage continued its ascent to an altitude of 200 kilometers.

Safir-1A
The Safir-1A is the first upgraded variant of the original Safir, these upgrades include, refinement of the second stage retro-rockets, stage separation systems, various sensors and telemetry systems, navigation and control systems, as well as increasing maximum orbit height from 250 to 275 kilometers.

Safir-1B

The Safir-1B is a further upgrade of the Safir-1A design, the first-stage engine has been upgraded and refined, resulting in an increase in thrust from 32 to 37tons (363 kN; 82,500 lbf), the second stage engine has been upgraded with thrust vector control capability and has been made more efficient. These upgrades have increased payload capability to 50 kilograms, and have increased maximum orbit height to 400 kilometers.

Retirement 
During the unveiling ceremony of the Zuljanah satellite launch vehicle on the state TV, Seyed Ahmad Husseini, the spokesman of the Ministry of Defense's Aerospace Organization stated that the Safir Launch vehicle is in a state of retirement and no further launches are planned with this vehicle.

Launch history
Safir has made eight launches so far, putting 4 satellites into orbit.

Gallery

See also
 International rankings of Iran in Science and Technology
Iranian Space Agency
Semnan Space Center
Other Iranian satellite launch vehicles

 Simorgh (rocket)
 Qased (rocket)
 Qaem-100 (rocket)
 Zuljanah (rocket)

References

External links

 Iran's Research Rocket Beams Back Science Data, Space.com
 Iran Launches Rocket, Unveils Space Center, Space.com
 Iran's Sputnik, SpaceRef.com
 Iran rocket claim raises tension, BBC
 Iran: Rocket Launch Another Show Of Prowess, RadioFreeEurope RadioLiberty
 Iran claims space rocket launch, AlJazeera
 Iranians inaugurate space project, BBC
 Iran to Launch 2 More Research Rockets Before Placing Satellite into Orbit This Summer, on Space.com
 Iran Launches Indigenous Carrier Rocket

Ballistic missiles of Iran
Space launch vehicles of Iran
Expendable space launch systems
Vehicles introduced in 2008